Xinjiekou station may refer to:

Xinjiekou station (Beijing Subway), on Line 4, Beijing Subway, China
Xinjiekou station (Nanjing Metro), on Line 1, Nanjing Metro, China